Keith John Hill (born 17 May 1969) is an English professional former footballer and football manager, who was most recently manager of National League club Scunthorpe United. 

In a 16-year-long playing career, Hill was a centre back who represented Blackburn Rovers, Plymouth Argyle, Rochdale, Cheltenham Town, Wrexham and Morecambe.

After retiring as a player, he went into coaching at Rochdale, and was twice the club's manager until sacked in March 2019. Following this, he endured a difficult spell as manager of hometown club Bolton Wanderers following their points deduction. He was appointed manager of Tranmere Rovers on 21 November 2020, but was sacked after the team reached the League Two play-offs in May 2021.

Playing career
Hill began his career with Blackburn Rovers, moving on to Plymouth Argyle in 1992 in a joint deal with Craig Skinner, with Nicky Marker moving in the opposite direction. Hill spent four years with Plymouth, moving on to Rochdale in 1996. After five years at Spotland, he joined Cheltenham Town, but he only spent a year there, playing only five matches, punctuated by a two-month loan with Wrexham. He then spent a year with Football Conference club Morecambe.

Managerial career

Rochdale
Following Hill's retirement from playing, he joined former club Rochdale's coaching staff, where he held the position of Director of Youth. On 17 December 2006, Hill was appointed as caretaker manager, following the sacking of Steve Parkin. His first match in charge against Milton Keynes Dons ended a 2–1 loss and they were left in the League Two relegation zone. His first win came two matches into his reign, a 4–0 win over Boston United, which lifted them out of the relegation zone. After his second 4–0 win, Rochdale appointed Hill as permanent manager on 3 January 2007. Rochdale ended the season in ninth, despite being in the bottom three for the majority of the first half of the season.

In his first full season as Dale boss, he took Rochdale to the 2008 League Two play-off final, where they lost 3–2 against Stockport County, having defeated Darlington 5–4 on penalties in the semi-final. The 2008–09 season saw Hill take Rochdale to the 2009 League Two play-off semi final for the second year in a row, but they were beaten 2–1 by Gillingham, the eventual winners. The next season saw improvement again, gaining automatic promotion, after a 1–0 win against Northampton Town on 17 April 2010. However, a dip in form near the end of the season saw Rochdale miss out on the League Two title, finishing third behind Notts County and AFC Bournemouth. Rochdale finished ninth in League One the following season. The 68 points gained meant the club had achieved their highest league finish since the 1969–70 season.

Barnsley
Hill was given permission to talk to Championship club Barnsley about their vacant manager's job on 20 May 2011. Four days later, he chose to remain with Rochdale because "we are ambitious but we're also happy in our work here." Hill changed his mind at the start of June and was appointed manager of Barnsley, with assistant David Flitcroft joining him. With a relatively small budget at his disposal, Hill mainly signed players from lower divisions. Rochdale players Matt Done and Scott Wiseman were among his first signings for Barnsley. Barnsley avoided relegation by one place in his first season in charge, with results having deteriorated following the sale of striker Ricardo Vaz Tê and long-term injuries to influential midfielders Jacob Butterfield, Jim O'Brien and David Perkins in January. Hill was sacked by Barnsley on 29 December 2012, following a defeat by Blackburn.

Return to Rochdale
Following the sacking of John Coleman Hill returned to manage Rochdale for a second spell on 22 January 2013. On 26 April 2014, Rochdale won 2–0 against Cheltenham, promoting them back to League One.

Bolton Wanderers
On 31 August 2019 after Bolton's match against Gillingham, Hill was announced as the new manager of his home town team, Bolton Wanderers. Hill said being the Bolton manager was his "dream job", and, to bolster a squad previously reliant on youth players, signed nine players before the transfer deadline closed on 2 September 2019. Hill did not take charge of the EFL Trophy match against Bradford City on 3 September 2019, as Bolton played the youth team for one last time, so Hill had Jimmy Phillips manage the match instead. This meant his first match was against Rotherham United on 14 September. Bolton took an early lead from a Thibaud Verlinden goal, however Rotherham retaliated by scoring six goals and won the match 6–1. This was Bolton's fourth consecutive league loss by five goals. His first win came on 22 October, a 2–0 win against Bristol Rovers. On 12 June 2020 it was announced that Bolton Wanderers would not be renewing his contract after relegation to League Two.

Tranmere Rovers
On 21 November 2020 Hill was named manager of League Two side Tranmere Rovers.  Hill was sacked on 11 May 2021, after the side reached the play-offs but before the play-off matches had started.

Scunthorpe United
On 5 November 2021, Hill was appointed manager of League Two's bottom side Scunthorpe United. His first match in charge was the following day where his side were defeated in the FA Cup First Round by League One side Doncaster Rovers. A 3–0 defeat to Leyton Orient on 15 April 2022 confirmed Scunthorpe's relegation from the Football League after a 72 year spell.

On 30 August 2022, Hill was sacked with the club sitting in 23rd position in the National League.

Managerial statistics

Honours

Player
Plymouth Argyle
Football League Third Division play-offs: 1995–96

Cheltenham Town
Football League Third Division play-offs: 2001–02

Manager
Rochdale
Football League Two promotion: 2009–10, 2013–14

Tranmere Rovers
EFL Trophy runner-up: 2020–21

Individual
League One Manager of the Month: January 2011, December 2016
League Two Manager of the Month: January 2007, January 2008, September 2009, December 2009, September 2013

References

External links

1969 births
Living people
Footballers from Bolton
English footballers
Association football defenders
Blackburn Rovers F.C. players
Plymouth Argyle F.C. players
Rochdale A.F.C. players
Cheltenham Town F.C. players
Wrexham A.F.C. players
Morecambe F.C. players
English Football League players
Premier League players
English football managers
Rochdale A.F.C. managers
Barnsley F.C. managers
Bolton Wanderers F.C. managers
Scunthorpe United F.C. managers
English Football League managers